Amelibaea is a genus of flies in the family Tachinidae. The genus was originally created as a subgenus of Phebellia.

Species
Amelibaea tultschensis (Brauer & von Bergenstamm, 1891)

Distribution
China, Czech Republic, Hungary, Romania, Slovakia, Bulgaria, Greece, Italy, France, Switzerland, Israel.

References

Insects of China
Exoristinae
Monotypic Brachycera genera
Tachinidae genera
Diptera of Asia
Diptera of Europe